Aesthetic of Ugliness (Aesthetik des Hässlichen) is a book by German philosopher Karl Rosenkranz, written in 1853.  It is among the earliest writings on the philosophy of ugliness and "draws an analogy between ugliness and moral evil".

Introduction
Section 1: Formlessness
Section 2: Incorrectness
Section 3: Deformation or Disfiguration
Conclusion

References

Karl Rosenkranz, Aesthetics of Ugliness. A Critical Edition. Translated by Andrei Pop and Mechtild Widrich. Bloomsbury, 2015.

1853 books